Antônio José Ferreira Viçoso (13 May 1787 - 7 July 1875) was a Portuguese Roman Catholic prelate who served as the Bishop of Mariana from 1843 until his death; he was also a professed member from the Congregation of the Mission. He relocated to Brazil prior to his episcopal appointment where he worked to establish the ecclesial institutions on a solid basis and opposed government efforts to control the ecclesial workings that he believed were under the domain of the episcopal superiors while he also was attentive to the needs of the poor in his diocese. In the face of strong opposition he ordained the first black slave ever to become a priest who was Blessed Francisco de Paula Victor.

His patron was Pedro II who titled him the "Count of Conceição" and made him an Imperial Counselor. Pedro II held the bishop in high esteem enough to the point that the two were collaborators and that Pedro II had granted him the Imperial Order of Christ and gave him the rank of officer of the Imperial Order of the Rose.

The cause for his beatification commenced after the bishop had died and culminated in 2014 after he was titled as Venerable once Pope Francis confirmed his life of heroic virtue.

Life
Antônio José Ferreira Viçoso was born in mid-1787 in Peniche in the Kingdom of Portugal to Jacinto Ferreira Viçoso and Maria Gertrudes; his paternal grandparents were Francisco Ferreira Viçoso and Joana Maria while his maternal grandparents were Luis dos Remédios and Joana Francisca.

In 1796 his father entrusted him to the Carmelite friars for his initial education. In 1802 he felt drawn to service as a priest and so commenced his studies for that in Santarém. He studied there until 1809 after which he returned to his home.

During his time back home he examined his future course in life and at last felt a call to enter the Congregation of the Mission. He enrolled in their institute as a seminarian in the Rilhafoles sector of Lisbon on 11 July 1811 to prepare himself for his ordination and began his novitiate with the order on 25 July. He received his ordination to the priesthood on 7 March 1818 after which he was sent to teach philosophical studies to seminarians at the order's institute in Évora.

In 1819 he was assigned to establish his order in Brazil which was then part of the Portuguese empire. He arrived alongside a companion - Leandro Rebelo Peixoto e Castro - in 1820 and the two settled in the Minas Gerais province. It was there that the pair founded the Colégio do Caraça and another in Jacuecanga before establishing another later in Angra dos Reis. He also assisted in a number of parishes throughout the province. He spent almost two decades in these ministries, until he was appointed in 1837 as the first superior of the order's newest ecclesiastical province in Brazil.

His patron and friend Pedro II nominated for the office of Bishop of Mariana on 15 July 1843 and this received official papal confirmation from Pope Gregory XVI on 22 January 1844. He then received his episcopal consecration as a bishop from Manoel de Monte Rodrigues de Araújo - the Archbishop of Rio de Janeiro - on 5 May 1844 at the Nossa Senhora do Monserrate in Rio de Janeiro. The new bishop first focused on the reform of the education seminarians were receiving in order to bring it into line with the mandates of the Council of Trent on the formation of prospective priests. To accomplish this he entrusted its operation to colleagues in his order in keeping with one of the goals of their congregation. He was an ultramontane and sought to establish the independence of the Roman Catholic Church from the efforts of the imperial court of Brazil to dominate it.

In a controversial case he became the first bishop to accept a black slave as a candidate for the priesthood and when he was called upon in 1849 to consider the desire of Blessed Francisco de Paula Victor to pursue this calling he chose to break all precedent and overrule canon law in accepting him as a seminarian. In the process he risked jeopardizing the position of the ecclesial authorities in a social landscape in which possessing slaves was still legal and formed a crucial part of the Brazilian economic enterprise. He himself ordained the former slave in 1851.

In 1854 he sent a letter to Pope Pius IX after the latter proclaimed the dogma of the Immaculate Conception while Viçoso praised the pope for the move in his letter to him. He admired Saint Anthony of Lisbon and Saint Teresa of Ávila while striving to base his episcopal mission on the example of Saint Alphonsus Maria de' Liguori. The bishop created the parish of São Sebastião de São Gotardo on 19 July 1872 and he also oversaw the construction of new schools and kindergartens. His patron Pedro II - on 7 March 1868 - titled him as the "Count of Conceição" and also made him an Imperial Counselor. The relationship between the pair was great enough to the point that Pedro II also granted Viçoso with the Order of the Rose (with the rank of officer) and the Order of Christ.

He died in his residence in mid-1875. The Archbishop of Mariana Silvério Gomes Pimenta - also the late bishop's godson - wrote a biographical of his predecessor.

Beatification process
The process for his beatification took place under the tenure of his archbishop godson who initiated the process in Mariana on 16 July 1916 during World War I and later oversaw its successful conclusion on 22 February 1922; the cause's initiation allowed for him to be titled as a Servant of God. But Archbishop Silvério Gomes Pimenta's death in August 1922 put a halt to the cause. It was not re-opened until a later bishop - Oscar de Oliveira - received permission from the competent ecclesial authorities to do so in 1985. The Congregation for the Causes of Saints under Pope John Paul II issued the official "nihil obstat" to the cause which would allow for its resumption. The archdiocese opened a diocesan process in 1985 which concluded on 10 October 1986 while documentation was sent in boxes to the C.C.S. in Rome who validated the process later on 13 June 1998.

The postulation compiled and submitted the Positio dossier to the C.C.S. in 2002 for further assessment at which stage historians approved it on 23 April 2002 after meeting. Theologians likewise approved the cause a decade later on 1 March 2013 as did the members of the C.C.S. on 2 March 2014. Pope Francis confirmed on 8 July 2014 that Viçoso had lived a model Christian life of heroic virtue and so named him as Venerable.

One miracle must be investigated and approved for him to be beatified and it must be one science and medicine cannot explain. One such case was investigated in Mariana from 13 December 2007 until the conclusion of the diocesan investigation on 22 May 2010.

The current postulator for this cause is Fr. Shijo Kanjirathamkunnel.

References

External links
 Saints SQPN
 Catholic Hierarchy
 Hagiography Circle

1787 births
1875 deaths
Vincentians
18th-century venerated Christians
19th-century Portuguese people
19th-century venerated Christians
19th-century Roman Catholic bishops in Brazil
People from Peniche, Portugal
Portuguese educators
Portuguese Roman Catholic bishops
Portuguese Roman Catholic missionaries
Roman Catholic missionaries in Brazil
Vincentian bishops
Venerated Catholics by Pope Francis
19th-century Portuguese educators
Roman Catholic bishops of Mariana